Charles Hayward Izard (19 January 1862 – 18 September 1925) was a Liberal Party Member of Parliament in New Zealand, and a Wellington lawyer.

Biography

Early life
After having primary education in Wellington, Izard was sent to Harrow, England and read for the bar at Lincoln's Inn where he was admitted as a barrister in 1883. On 12 July 1886, Izard married Stella Margaret Halsted at St Paul's Cathedral in Wellington.

Professional career
Izard returned to New Zealand and practiced with the firm Bell Gully together with his father. He subsequently practised on his own, and later partners included Thomas S. Weston, J. F. B. Stevenson, and S. J. Castle.

Political career

Izard was for many years a member of Wellington City Council.

He was elected to the Wellington North electorate in the 1905 election, but was defeated in 1908. His younger brother, Dr Arnold Woolford Izard, stood for the Wellington North electorate in the 1911 election on behalf of the Liberal Party.

He was appointed to the Legislative Council by the National wartime coalition government on 7 May 1918, and served there until he died in 1925.

Family and death
He died at his residence in Upper Hutt on 18 September 1925. His funeral service was held at St Paul's Cathedral in Wellington, and he was buried at Karori Cemetery. He was survived by his wife Stella Izard. They had one son, Keith Halsted Izard, who died in London in 1919.

Legacy
Izard left the bulk of his estate for the establishment of an educational and charitable trust, the Charles Hayward Izard Trust, administered by the Wellington City Council. Izard Road in Wellington is named after him.

Notes

References

1862 births
1925 deaths
New Zealand Liberal Party MPs
Members of the New Zealand House of Representatives
19th-century New Zealand lawyers
Members of Lincoln's Inn
Members of the New Zealand Legislative Council
New Zealand Liberal Party MLCs
Wellington City Councillors
New Zealand MPs for Wellington electorates
Unsuccessful candidates in the 1890 New Zealand general election
Unsuccessful candidates in the 1908 New Zealand general election
Burials at Karori Cemetery
People educated at Harrow School